Anastasia Slutskaya (born Anastasia Ivanovna; late 1400s – circa 1526) was a Belarusian noblewoman. She was the regent of the Principality of Slutsk during the minority of Yury (Prince of Slutsk) in 1503-1512.

Biography 
She was the daughter of Ivan Yurievich, Prince of Mstislavl, from his first marriage with Ulyana. 

In the early 1490s, Anastasia married Semion Mikhailovich Slutsky, Prince of Slutsk and Kopyl, who died in 1503. Since their son, Yuri, was still too young, Anastasia became the ruler of the principality.

At the time, the Tatars often attacked the principality. Prince Semion had to repel multiple attacks. After his death, Princess Anastasia led the troops to fight the invaders. She managed to protect the Principality of Slutsk from 1505 to 1508, although the land was devastated after the raids.

The young widow had many suitors. The most famous of Anastasia's admirers was Prince Mikhail Lvovich Glinsky, a prominent Lithuanian lord. According to Maciej Stryjkowski, a late 16th-century Polish historian, Anastasia and Mikhail had an affair. However, when Mikhail proposed in 1508, she turned the offer down. To win her over, the suitor made two attempts to take Slutsk by storm, both unsuccessful. Later, Glinsky and his brothers went to serve Grand Duke of Moscow Vasily III. In his message to Vasily III, Mikhail Glinski confessed that it was his relative Andrew Drozhdzh who had besieged Slutsk, not him.

When Anastasia's son Yuri grew older, he became the ruler of the principality while his mother stepped down.

Nothing is known about the last years of Anastasia's life. She died at the age of 55 (circa 1526), and her death is recorded in the Suprasl Necrology.

Personal life 
Husband: 
 Semion Mikhailovich Slutsky (died on November 14, 1503), Prince of Slutsk and Kopyl since 1481

Children: 
 Yuri (1492–1542), Prince of Slutsk since 1503
 Tatiana 
 Alexandra, married to Konstantin Ivanovich Ostrogski (1460 or 1463 – September 11, 1530)

Representation in art 
Some East Slavic epics are directly or indirectly dedicated to Slutskaya as a brave female warrior.  

In 2003, Belarusfilm production company dedicated a movie to Anastasia Slutskaya. Her role was played by Svetlana Zelenkovskaya.

In September 2016, a monument to Slutskaya was erected in Slutsk, Belarus.

On October 30, 2018, the ballet "Anastasia" premiered at the National Academic Grand Opera and Ballet Theatre of Belarus to music by the contemporary Belarusian composer Vyacheslav Kuznetsov. The ballet was directed by Yuri Troyan, People's Artist of Belarus.

References

Bibliography 

 
 Легенды и были. Жанна Д'Арк из Белой Руси.   12 мая 2012 года.
 
 Анастасия Слуцкая.   12 мая 2012 года.

16th-century women rulers
15th-century women
16th-century deaths
15th-century births
Belarusian women
Belarusian nobility